II Pegasi is a binary star system in the constellation of Pegasus with an apparent magnitude of 7.4 and a distance of 130 light-years. It is a very active RS Canum Venaticorum variable (RS CVn), a close binary system with active starspots.

The primary (II Pegasi A) is a cool subgiant, an orange K-type star. It has begun to evolve off the main sequence and expand. Starspots cover about 40% of its surface. The star produces intense flares observable at all wavelengths.

Its smaller companion (II Pegasi B) is too close to have been observed directly. It is a red dwarf, an M-type main-sequence star. The stars are tidally locked in a very close orbit with a period of 6.7 days and a separation of a few stellar radii.

X-ray flares from II Pegasi A were observed with the Ariel 5 satellite in the 1970s and with later X-ray observatories. In December 2005 a superflare was detected by the Swift Gamma-Ray Burst Mission. It was the largest stellar flare ever seen and was a hundred million times more energetic than the Sun's typical solar flare.

References

RS Canum Venaticorum variables
Pegasus (constellation)
Pegasi, II
224085
K-type subgiants
M-type main-sequence stars
Durchmusterung objects
117915
4375
Binary stars